Richard Taylor Trout (18 December 1851 – 30 June 1932) was a company director and member of the Queensland Legislative Assembly.

Biography
Trout was born in Exeter, Devon, to John Trout and his wife Sarah (née Tree). He came to Australia at an early age and was educated at Brisbane State School. He worked at the government printer before trying his hand at mining at Palmer and became a director of Sturmfels Ltd, a wool broking company.

On 3 February 1872 he married Sophie Anne Newman (died 1937) at the residence of the bride's father, The Oval and together had five sons and five daughters. He died at Ashgrove, Brisbane, and his funeral proceeded from Cumestree, his Ashgrove home to the Toowong Cemetery.

Political career
Trout, for the Ministerialists, won the 1911 by-election for the seat of Enoggera following the resignation of Arthur Hawthorn who had become a member of the Queensland Legislative Council. He defeated the Labor candidate, William Lloyd by 145 votes.

He held Enoggera until losing to Lloyd at the 1915 state election.

References

Members of the Queensland Legislative Assembly
1851 births
1932 deaths
Burials at Toowong Cemetery